San Ramon Valley High School is a four-year public high school located in the East Bay neighborhood of Danville, California, United States. It is a part of the San Ramon Valley Unified School District. It is a National Blue Ribbon school from the Blue Ribbon Schools Program as well as a California Distinguished School. Its rival is Monte Vista High School.

Advanced Placement Courses 
San Ramon Valley High School offers 22 Advanced Placement courses to their students. Those who take these classes are given a weighted grade point for the class when calculating their GPAs. The AP classes offered at San Ramon Valley include:
 Biology
 Chemistry
 Calculus AB
 Calculus BC
 Computer Science A
 Computer Science Principles
 European History
 English Language
 English Literature
 Environmental Science
 French Language and Culture
 Government and Politics Comparative
 Government and Politics US
 Human Geography
 Microeconomics
 Music Theory
 Physics C
 Psychology
 Spanish Language and Culture
 Statistics
 Studio Art
 US History

Athletics 
San Ramon Valley High School offers 23 sports across the Fall, Winter, and Spring sports seasons. These teams compete in the East Bay Athletic League and play teams in close by cities. Their league is EBAL (East Bay Athletic League). The sports played at San Ramon Valley include:
 Baseball
 Cross Country
 Competitive Cheer
 Football
 Men's/Women's Basketball
 Men's/Women's Golf
 Men's/Women's Lacrosse
 Men's/Women's Soccer
 Men's/Women's Tennis
 Men's/Women's Volleyball
 Men's/Women's Water Polo
 Softball
 Swimming and Diving
 Spirit Leading
 Track and Field
 Wrestling

Native American remains unearthed 

On July 8, 2009, construction workers unearthed the remains of a Bay Miwok Native American while working on the new gymnasium, temporarily halting construction. Following an archaeological dig, the remains of more than two dozen Native Americans were found on the site, which may have served as a mortuary complex. The remains were re-buried in the Ohlones Indian Cemetery in Fremont.

Demographics

The demographic breakdown of the 2,077 students enrolled in 2017-2018 was:
Male - 48.9%
Female - 51.1%
Native American/Alaska Native - <0.1%
Asian - 7.8%
Black - 0.1%
Hispanic - 9.4%
Native Hawaiian/Pacific Islander - <0.1%
White - 74.4%
Multiracial - 6.7%

4.3% of the students were eligible for free or reduced lunch.

Notable alumni 

 John F. Baldwin Jr. – U.S. Representative
 Scott Bauhs – distance runner for Adidas, NCAA Division II 5k (2008), 10k (2007) and cross country champion (2008) 
 Jim Bogios – drummer for band Counting Crows
 Jeff Campitelli – percussionist, most notably as drummer for guitarist Joe Satriani
 D'Arcy Carden – comedic actress, The Good Place
 Chris Carter – former NFL wide receiver  
 Kevin Davidson – NFL player
 John Gesek – football player for Dallas Cowboys and 2-time Super Bowl champion
 Roy Helu – Former NFL running Back
 Guy Houston – former member of the California State Assembly
 J. J. Koski – Wide Receiver for Los Angeles Rams
 Bob Ladouceur – former head coach for De La Salle High School football team
 Jason Lucash  –  inventor and founder of Origaudio, Times Top 50 Inventions of 2009; successful participant on ABC's show Shark Tank, and Entrepreneurs 2012 "Entrepreneur of the Year" 
 Mark Madsen  – former National Basketball Association player for Minnesota Timberwolves and Los Angeles Lakers; won NBA championship with Lakers and is currently the head men's basketball coach at Utah Valley University
 Colin Mullan – race car driver, currently racing in GT4 America Series with Andretti Autosport
 Casey Pratt – Oakland A's journalist for ABC 7
 Dru Samia – New York Jets offensive lineman
 Omar Samhan – professional basketball player; played in NCAA Sweet 16 in 2010 for Saint Mary's College of California
 Brandon Schantz – filmmaker and television producer
 Nate Schierholtz – former MLB player for Chicago Cubs and 2010 World Series champion San Francisco Giants
 Mark Tollefsen – basketball player, 2018-19 top scorer in the Israel Basketball Premier League
 Keith Varon – singer, songwriter, producer signed to Bug Publishing
 Randy Winn – former Major League Baseball player for San Francisco Giants

References

External links
 San Ramon Valley High School
 San Ramon Valley Unified School District

Schools needing cleanup
High schools in Contra Costa County, California
Public high schools in California
1910 establishments in California
Educational institutions established in 1910